"Take over the World" is the second single to be released from The Courteeners second album Falcon. It was released as a Digital Download on 25 April 2010, and the CD single was released the following day. The song features in the Visa 2012 Olympics advertising.

Chart performance
A lack of radio airplay meant that "Take Over the World" is currently The Courteeners' second least successful single, after Cavorting peaked at #192 in 2007. The single debuted on the UK Singles Chart on 2 May 2010 at a current peak of #114.

Track listing
CD
1."Take over The World"
2."Piercing Blues"

7" (1)
1."Take over The World"
2."There is a Light That Never Goes Out (feat. Miles Kane) [Live from XFM Winter Wonderland]

7" (2)
1."Take over The World (Demo)
2."Why Do You Do It? (Le Mouv Session)"

EP
1."Take over The World (Demo)
2."Piercing Blues"
3."There is a Light That Never Goes Out (feat. Miles Kane) [Live from XFM Winter Wonderland]"
4."Why Do You Do It? (Le Mouv session)"

Credits
Engineer – Lee Slater (tracks: 1) 
Mixed By – Jeremy Wheatley (tracks: 1) 
Producer – Ed Buller (tracks: 1), Tom Knott (tracks: 2) 
Written By – Liam Fray

References

2010 singles
The Courteeners songs
Song recordings produced by Ed Buller
2010 songs
Songs written by Liam Fray
Polydor Records singles